Penrith Stadium (known commercially as BlueBet Stadium) is a rugby league and association football stadium located in Penrith, New South Wales, Australia.

The 22,500 capacity venue is the home ground for the Penrith Panthers who play in the National Rugby League (NRL). The all-time attendance record for the venue is 22,582 in a match between the Panthers and their Western Sydney rivals Parramatta on 17 July 2010.

The stadium is set to be demolished after the 2023 season with a new stadium built on the neighbouring site currently occupied by the Penrith Paceway.

History
Panthers Stadium has been used by the Penrith Panthers since their entry into the National Rugby League competition in 1967. Initially, the Stadium only had one main grandstand, the Western grandstand while the ground itself was oval in shape. In the 1980s, the stadium was redeveloped into a rectangle arena more suitable for rugby league and other sports such as association football (soccer) and rugby union. This redevelopment also saw the construction of the Eastern Grandstand. In 2006, a joint Federal and State Government funding project saw $30 million worth of investments come to the Stadium. In the subsequent developments, the Western Grandstand was extended and revamped. Following the completion of the project, the Stadium now holds 8,000 seats in the Grandstand.

Two of Samoa's 2008 Rugby League World Cup matches were played at CUA Stadium: their Group C game against Tonga and their 9th place play-off match against former twice World Cup Finalists France.

At the end of 2010, the Federal and State Governments provided funding to redevelop the scoreboard end of the stadium. Initial plans were to build a double-sided grandstand between Penrith Stadium and Howell Oval. However, it was found that a main sewer line ran between the stadium and Howell Oval. Relocation of the line would have cost nearly double what the initial funding would cover. Subsequently, a stand is currently being constructed at Howell Oval, and the facilities at the Scoreboard end of the stadium were redeveloped.

A new video screen was purchased from Subiaco Oval in Perth in 2018 and was installed prior to the start of the 2019 NRL season at the Family Hill end.

On June 17, 2021, multiple news sources reported that the New South Wales government was considering funding a major redevelopment of the stadium. The proposal would entail the demolition of the facility and the construction of a 25,000 to 30,000 seat stadium on the site. The stadium was reported to cost 200 to 300 million dollars and would be built with the funds originally allocated for the redevelopment of Accor Stadium which was cancelled due to the COVID-19 pandemic. On the 9th of December, 2021, premier of NSW, Dominic Perrottet and Stuart Ayres, minister for Tourism and Western Sydney, alongside Penrith Panthers players Nathan Cleary and Brian To'o officially announced the new stadium. Under the original plan, the current stadium would close its doors and be demolished at the end of the 2022 NRL season and will reopen in 2025.

However, in July 2022, the NSW government entered talks with the Penrith Paceway, a major horse racing facility, to buy the land it sits on to build a brand new stadium. The new plan would allow the Panthers to play at the existing site until the new stadium is built. The plan is to then demolish the current ground.

In February 2023, the ground hosted the 2023 World Club Challenge clash between two-time reigning NRL premiers the Penrith Panthers and four-time defending Super League champions St Helens R.F.C..

Naming rights
Penrith Stadium was sponsored by Credit Union Australia, who previously held the naming rights, from early 2006 until 31 October 2010. The stadium's name was sometimes shortened to CUA Stadium.

On 22 January 2011, it was announced that sport betting agency Centrebet had acquired the rights to the sponsorship name of the stadium until 2016. Under their sponsorship rights the stadium was also known as the "Centrebet Stadium Penrith".

On 21 June 2011, it was announced that, for the Women in League round of the NRL, Centrebet had agreed to forego the naming rights for one week, during which time the stadium would officially be known as "McGrath Foundation Stadium".

On 28 January 2014, it was announced that sport betting agency Sportingbet acquired the rights to the sponsorship name of the stadium, changing the stadium's name to Sportingbet Stadium Penrith.

On 12 February 2015, Pepper Group had replaced Sportingbet as the naming rights sponsor, renaming the stadium to Pepper Stadium.

At the end of 2017, Pepper Group ended their sponsorship of the ground and the stadium was renamed Panthers Stadium.

On 22 March 2021, BlueBet was announced as the stadium's naming rights partner, signing a two-year deal.

Tenants
In the National Rugby League competition, the Penrith Panthers club have played at this stadium, as their home ground, ever since making their first grade appearance in 1967.

In the National Soccer League, the Penrith City SC club played here in 1984–1985.

The stadium hosted a Western Sydney Wanderers pre-season friendly against Adelaide United on 22 September 2013, and was host to a competitive A-League Premiership match against the Wellington Phoenix on 8 February 2015. The Wanderers also played an FFA Cup match against Brisbane Roar at the venue on 11 August 2015.

On 16 September 2017 the venue hosted an international women's friendly football game when the Matildas defeated Brazil 2–1 in front of a crowd of 15,089.

Rugby league test matches
List of rugby league test and World Cup matches played at Penrith Stadium.

International Soccer matches
List of International Football matches played at Penrith Stadium.

Gallery

References

External links
 

Rugby league stadiums in Australia
Rugby League World Cup stadiums
Soccer venues in Sydney
Sports venues in Sydney
Penrith Panthers
1967 establishments in Australia
Sports venues completed in 1967
A-League Women stadiums
Penrith, New South Wales